The Kaiserin Augusta Gymnasium Berlin was a German school based in Charlottenburg, a locality of Berlin. It started in 1818 as a private school, founded by Ludwig Cauer. In 1869, it expanded and became a gymnasium. In 1876 it was named after Empress Augusta, wife of William I. After World War II it merged with the Mommsen-Gymnasium. A new building was erected in 1956 and a new name was given, Erich-Hoepner-Gymnasium after Erich Hoepner. Since 2008, the name of the school is Heinz-Berggruen-Gymnasium after Heinz Berggruen.

Notable alumni
Hermann Brück
Max Weber
Wilhelm Cauer
Ernst August Weiß

References

External links
"Die Geschichte unserer Schule", Ludwig Cauer Grundschule official site (in German), accessed and archived 29 July 2012.
"Ludwig-Cauer-Grundschule Berlin", Architektur Bild Archiv (in German), accessed and archived 29 July 2012.

Schools in Berlin
Educational institutions established in 1818